Cane is an American drama television series created by Cynthia Cidre, who also served as executive producer alongside Jonathan Prince, Jimmy Iovine, and Polly Anthony. The pilot was directed by Christian Duguay. The show chronicled the lives and internal power struggles of a powerful and wealthy Cuban-American family running an immensely successful rum and sugarcane business in South Florida.

Produced by ABC Studios, CBS Paramount Network Television, El Sendero Productions, Interscope Records, and Once A Frog Productions, the series premiered on September 25, 2007, airing on Tuesday nights at 10:00/9:00c on CBS, following The Unit. The series premiere of the show brought in 11 million viewers, the best in its time slot since 1999's Judging Amy.

Plot
Starring Jimmy Smits, this epic drama chronicles the external rivalries and internal power struggles of a large Cuban-American family running an immensely successful rum and sugarcane business in South Florida. When the family patriarch, Pancho Duque, is offered a lucrative but questionable deal by his bitter adversaries, the Samuels, he is faced with a difficult choice: Should he cash out of the sugar business and focus solely on rum, which would please his biological son, Frank Duque? Or should he protect the family legacy that he built from the ground up by refusing to sell? This would involve siding with his son-in-law, Alex Vega, who despises the Samuels and foresees multibillion-dollar profits from future ethanol contracts.

Alex and Frank's approaches to business are as different as their approaches to life. While Frank focuses on chasing women, Alex is devoted to his beautiful wife, Isabel Vega. Married to him when she was just 17 years old, Isabel chooses not to involve herself in the family business, focusing instead on raising their three children, who are determined to forge their own paths outside the family. Will family allegiance come first or will their secrets and acrimonious conflicts over love, lust, and money lead to their downfall?

Cast
Jimmy Smits portrays Alex Vega in the lead role as the Duques' adopted son and chosen heir to the family's sugar and rum business. Smits is also a co-executive producer of the show. Héctor Elizondo and Rita Moreno star as Pancho and Amalia Duque, the family patriarch and matriarch. Nestor Carbonell was cast as Frank Duque, the impulsive firstborn son. Other Duque children are portrayed by Paola Turbay and Eddie Matos as Isabel Duque Vega, Alex's wife and mother of three children, and Henry Duque, the youngest son of Pancho and Amalia, respectively. Alex and Isabel's children are played respectively by Michael Trevino, Lina Esco, and Samuel Carman as Jaime, Katie, and Artie Vega. Oscar Torre played Santo, a Cuban refugee who was Mr. Vega's bodyguard.   Polly Walker and Ken Howard appear as Ellis and Joe Samuels, members of the Duques' rival family, and Alona Tal rounds out the cast portraying Rebecca (King) Vega, Jaime's wife.

Casting
Casting for all of the principal roles on the show took place from February to March 2007. Smits was the first actor to be cast in February 2007, while also serving as producer under his production company, El Sendero Productions. In order of casting, Nestor Carbonell, Eddie Matos, Rita Moreno, and Michael Trevino were chosen to play their respective parts in February, while Hector Elizondo, Samuel Carman, Alona Tal, Lina Esco, and Paola Turbay joined the cast in early March. Polly Walker was the last to join the cast a few weeks before HBO aired the last episode of Rome.

Cancellation
Due to the 2007–2008 Writers Guild of America strike, Cane completed its first season on December 18, 2007. On February 8, 2008, the Los Angeles Times reported that the effects of the writers strike "could spell sudden death for such programs as NBC's Bionic Woman and CBS' Cane, industry executives predicted." It was also reported by USA Today that Cane would be "gone for good." On February 14, 2008, CBS released a statement declaring that Cane is still on "hiatus to accommodate the midseason launches of Big Brother, Jericho, and Dexter." In an April 2008 interview, CBS Entertainment President Nina Tassler called the drama's chances for renewal "a real long shot." On May 14, 2008, CBS officially cancelled the series.

Production

Conception
The series began development when Polly Anthony, an Interscope Records executive, and Jonathan Prince pitched the idea of a "Latino Godfather" series to CBS entertainment chief, Nina Tassler. Tassler then suggested Cynthia Cidre, an Emmy Award-nominated screenwriter, pen the script for the pilot. Although initially reluctant since she had already written about her Cuban-American heritage several times in her career, Cidre warmed up to the idea, believing that her previous Latin-themed projects were ahead of their time and that she should return to her roots.

The project was initially titled, Los Duques (The Dukes) or Untitled Cynthia Cidre Project, when commissioned in January 2007 but was later renamed Cane in May 2007. Christian Duguay agreed to direct the pilot in March 2007. The series was picked up and given a 13-episode order on May 14, 2007.

Broadcasting history
The series premiered on CBS on September 25, 2007, as announced on July 18, 2007, by the network. The pilot episode was leaked to BitTorrent websites in the same month to the chagrin of studio executives. Cane was unaffected by the 2007 Writers Guild of America strike, as all the episodes had been written before the strike started.

International distribution

Episodes

U.S. Nielsen ratings

In the following table, "Rating" is the estimated percentage of all televisions tuned to the show, and "Share" is the percentage of all televisions in use that are tuned in.

season1: #58 2007 8.9

References

External links

2000s American drama television series
2007 American television series debuts
2007 American television series endings
CBS original programming
English-language television shows
Television series by ABC Studios
Television series by CBS Studios
Television shows set in Miami